KNDU (channel 25) is a television station licensed to Richland, Washington, United States, serving the Tri-Cities area as an affiliate of NBC. It is owned by the Spokane-based Cowles Company as part of the KHQ Television Group. KNDU's studios are located on West Kennewick Avenue in Kennewick, and its transmitter is located on Jump Off Joe Butte.

Although identifying as a separate station in its own right, KNDU is considered a semi-satellite of KNDO (channel 23) in Yakima. As such, it simulcasts all network and syndicated programming as provided through its parent, and the two stations share a website. However, KNDU airs separate commercial inserts and legal identifications. Local newscasts, produced by KNDU, are simulcast on both stations. KNDU serves the eastern half of the Yakima/Tri-Cities market while KNDO serves the western portion. The two stations are counted as a single unit for ratings purposes. Master control and some internal operations are based at the studios of sister station, fellow NBC affiliate and company flagship KHQ-TV on West Sprague Avenue in downtown Spokane.

On satellite, KNDU is only available on Dish Network, while DirecTV carries KNDO instead.

History
On August 16, 1960, the Columbia Empire Broadcasting Corporation filed to build a new TV station on channel 25 in Richland. The company was composed of employees of KNDO and KTNT-TV in Tacoma and had also filed to buy KNDO. The Federal Communications Commission (FCC) granted the permit on May 24, 1961, and the station was announced to be a satellite of KNDO, then a primary ABC affiliate. Programming began August 10, 1961. A major increase in power was made in 1966.

In 1965, KNDU became a primary NBC affiliate, but it continued to air some ABC programs until 1970, when KVEW went on the air as a full-time ABC affiliate; at that point, KNDU became an exclusive NBC affiliate.

Programming
In addition to the NBC network schedule, syndicated programming on KNDU includes Hot Bench, The Drew Barrymore Show, Jeopardy!, and Wheel of Fortune, among others.

In the past like KNDO, the station pre-empted much of the NBC lineup post-Late Night, including Later and Friday Night Videos/Friday Night, along with the network's Nightside rolling news block, as the station carried syndicated programming, then continued to sign off the air nightly. It began to air all three programs in 1996, shortly after Federal took control of the station.

Notable former on-air staff
 Jamie Kern (now with IT Cosmetics)
 Whit Johnson (now with ABC News/Good Morning America (weekend edition))
 Jim Snyder (1987–1989; now with KSNV)

Subchannels 
The station's digital signal is multiplexed:

KNDO and KNDU have been digital-only since February 17, 2009. NBC Weather Plus had been carried on digital subchannel 25.3; the originating national network ceased operation on December 1, 2008.

On September 1, 2010, KNDO and KNDU discontinued broadcasting Universal Sports on digital subchannel 25.2. They will be giving this bandwidth to SWX Right Now (25.3) to improve the picture of SWX programming.

References

External links

SWX Right Now

NBC network affiliates
Cowles Company
Tri-Cities, Washington
Television channels and stations established in 1961
NDU
1961 establishments in Washington (state)